The surname Constable may refer to:

Andrew Constable, Lord Constable (1865–1928), Scottish politician and judge
Albert Constable (1805–1855), American politician
Archibald Constable (1774–1827), Scottish publisher and bookseller, whose business continues as Constable & Robinson
Bernie Constable (1921–1997), English cricketer 
Cuthbert Constable (died 1746), English physician and antiquary
Dean Constable (born 1980), Canadian politician
Dennis Constable (born 1925), English cricketer
Elinor G. Constable (born 1934), American diplomat
Emma Constable (born 1975), English badminton player
Frank Challice Constable (1846–1937), English barrister and writer
Francis Constable (1592–1647), English bookseller and publisher 
Henry Constable (1562–1613), English poet
Ian Constable, Australian ophthalmologist 
James Constable (born 1984), English footballer 
Jim Constable (1933-2002), American baseball player
Jimmy Constable (born 1971), British pop singer
John Constable (1776–1837), English painter
Kate Constable (born 1966), Australian author
Liz Constable (born 1943), Australian politician 
Marmaduke Constable (c. 1455–1518), English soldier
Paule Constable, British lighting designer
Robert Constable (c. 1478–1537), English nobleman and soldier
Robert L. Constable (born 1942), American computer scientist
Thomas Constable (printer and publisher) (1812–81), Scottish printer and publisher
Sir William Constable, 1st Baronet (bap. 1590–1655), English soldier and politician
William George Constable (1887–1976), English-American art historian

English-language surnames
Occupational surnames
English-language occupational surnames